Louis Vincent Aronson (December 25, 1869 – November 3, 1940), inventor and businessman, founded The Art Metal Works, which evolved to manufacture the Ronson lighters.

Biography

Louis Vincent Aronson was an American inventor, industrialist and philanthropist who is best remembered as the inventor of Ronson lighters. "He was a son of Simon and Jennie Aronson, who were natives of Prussia. He was born December 25, 1869, in New York City, and there his boyhood was spent."

“As a Christmas present,” he said in later years, ''“I always felt I ought to qualify by making the world happier. If I have done so, even in the slightest degree, I am so much the happier myself because I had the luck to be born on Christmas Day. My parents used to tell me that a Christmas Child should carry the Christmas spirit with him all the year, no matter what his religious faith might be."

Early life and education
Aronson was an exceptionally gifted young man who graduated from public school at the age of 12 before entering a New York Technical School specializing in metallurgy, practical metal working and mechanical drawing. At the same time, he set up a laboratory in the basement of his parents' home where he experimented with plating processes and turned out money-making items while he devised ways of metalizing common items, in a durable finish of matte gold, including flowers, butterflies, animal claws and baby shoes.

Aronson natural ability for designing was honed at the technical school and served him well throughout his life. He excelled and completed the School’s four year academic program in three years. When he graduated in 1886, at the age of 16, he was qualified as an Expert Metallurgist, Draftsman and Designer, he also  had a high level knowledge of Chemistry. He returned to the school five years later as an instructor in metallurgy for several years before devoting all his time to his own company. When he was 24 years old, he sold the rights to a commercially valuable metal plating process according to Urban Cummings book Ronson, The Worlds Greatest Lighters, Wick Lighters 1913–2000. While retaining full use of his invention, young Aronson sold the patent rights for $5000 and used the proceeds to open his own company named the Art Metal Works.

CareerLouis V. Aronson gained public recognition when he won an award in 1893 from the Belgian government for the creation of the first non-toxic match, and young businessman Aronson received 50,000 Francs, equaling $10,000 in U.S. dollars. In 1897 he received a U.S. patent (592,227) for a match design (called the Wind-match) that would light in windy conditions or when wet. He continued working on his match designs including inventing the “Birds Eye” or “Kitchen” match that had a dual-tip design in 1903; this was an important safety improvement because friction matches of the day would sometimes light accidentally especially when stepped on or while in one’s pocket. He realized that placing a small friction ignition chemical on the tip instead of the entire match-head greatly limited accidental ignition. This style of match is still in use today.

Aronson continued his research on all-weather matches finally receiving U.S. patent (1,287,819) in 1918, for a match that was praised by soldiers who were fighting in mud-filled trenches during World War I. His proficiency with matches led to a U.S. patent (1,295,952) for Bomb fuses also used in World War I, which he donated to the U.S. Government for the duration of the war, later earning his company the prestigious Distinguished Service Certificate from President Woodrow Wilson and the War Department. Through his research on matches, he sought to create and refine igniting devices that were efficient, safe and commercially viable.

By the year 1910 he received his first patent for a pocket lighter (U.S. Pat. 965,149). His pocket lighter used flint material which contained a mixture of cerium and iron according to the patent. His design was a simple device that created a shower of sparks with the press of a finger - but there was no sustainable flame. Based on the patent dates, this device preceded the Pist-O-Liter (U.S. Pat. 966,153) which he successfully produced that year, but likewise, it only produced sparks. Within three years he received a patent titled Pyrophorous Lighter, (U.S. Pat. 1,084,386) which we now appreciate as the Paragon striker lighter, a simple device capable of producing and sustaining a flame by means of a steel-tipped wand fitted with a cloth-wick saturated in petroleum ether also known as Benzine or Naphtha. The following year, 1914, he was granted a design patent for the well known Bulldog striker lighter (Des. Pat. D 45,407) which utilized the same principles as the Paragon, and soon became a very popular table lighter.

Aronson’s earlier efforts to produce igniting devices led him to invent many other useful and profitable items too. His ongoing experiments sparked ideas for other successful inventions like safe children’s toys including sparking guns, spinning tops & pinwheels and a series of hand held toys with sparking eyes called Archie(s). He dedicated much of his time to causes that benefited children and the under-privileged in society.

Before long the company was producing a variety of high quality lamps, book ends, statues and other decorative items, prized today for their detail in the collector marketplace.

In 1913 Louis Aronson''' applied for a patent for a Liter (lighter), which was approved along with others in years to come. In 1926 he released a new "automatic operation" Banjo lighter, which offered both ignition and extinguishment in a single push. It was a great success, demand shortly exceeding supply, spurring Aronson to patent it and design other products around the invention, which were marketed under the Ronson brand name.

With the success of the Art Metal Works and Ronson lighters, Aronson went on to become a Newark political and civic leader. He ran for Newark mayor in 1912, was a longtime treasurer of Essex County, New Jersey, Republicans, and became a bank executive. In time, Aronson's firm became the largest concern of its kind in the world.

Personal life
Aronson's first wife, Gertrude Deutsch Aronson, died in 1934. He remarried in 1935, to stock-company actress Mabel Brownell.

Death
Louis V.Aronson died on November 2, 1940 in Long Branch, New Jersey.

See also
Ronson (company)
Lighter

References

1869 births
1940 deaths
American manufacturing businesspeople
Businesspeople from New York City